Alvania formicarum is a species of minute sea snail, a marine gastropod mollusk or micromollusk in the family Rissoidae.

Description

Distribution
They are typically found on the east coast of the Formigas Islets in the Azores

References

External links

Rissoidae
Gastropods described in 1989